CREUP (La Coordinadora de Representantes de Estudiantes de Universidades Públicas or Coordinator of Student Representatives of Public Universities) is a Spanish association that represents more than 1,000,000 students. Nowadays it is formed by 31 public universities.

External links

Student organisations in Spain